The Foresthill Bridge, also referred to as the Auburn-Foresthill Bridge or the Auburn Bridge, is a road bridge crossing over the North Fork American River in Placer County and the Sierra Nevada foothills, in eastern California.

History
It was fabricated in 1971 by Kawasaki Heavy Industries in Japan, built by Willamette Western Contractors, and opened in 1973. The bridge spans the North Fork of the American River in Placer County between the city of Auburn and the town of Foresthill in the Sierra Nevada foothills. Pedestrians can walk the length of the bridge in both directions. There was anti-Auburn Dam graffiti, showing protest of the planned dam, on the bridge's underside.

A seismic retrofit project began in January 2011 and was completed in 2015, with an estimated cost of $74.4 million. The original bridge cost less than $13 million.

In media
The bridge can be seen in the beginning of the 2002 film XXX  in which Vin Diesel's character Xander Cage is seen driving a stolen red Chevrolet Corvette off it, then jumping from the car mid-flight and parachuting to his accomplices at the bottom of the American River Canyon.

It also appears in a montage sequence toward the end of the romantic comedy The Ugly Truth, and has been utilized in multiple exercise equipment advertisements.

Suicides
Due to its height, the bridge is a noteworthy suicide site.  As of mid-2021, there have been 94 suicides since the bridge's construction. As part of the bridge's 2011-2015 renovations, a 6½ foot tall pedestrian barrier was installed to prevent further attempts.

2021 Fire
The Bridge Fire, which burned under the Foresthill Bridge, started on September 5th and burned for a total of 9 days. 411 acres were burned with CAL-FIRE reporting one injury.

See also
List of bridges in the United States by height

List of suicide sites

References

External links
Foothill.net: Foresthill Bridge
Highestbridges.com: List of 500 highest International Bridges
Placer County Historical Society
Flickr.com aerial photo
http://www.auburnjournal.com/article/7/16/18/2-suicide-saves-2-days-foresthill-bridge-near-auburn

Transportation buildings and structures in Placer County, California
Cantilever bridges
Road bridges in California
Steel bridges in the United States
Bridges completed in 1971
Bridges over the American River